Brandon Oaks is a neighborhood located in Union County, North Carolina. Its main road is Brandon Oaks Parkway.

Brandon Oaks Parkway 
Brandon Oaks Parkway is the major road running through the entirety of the neighborhood. It weaves its way from Old Monroe Rd, and ends at a roundabout in which the road turns into Pony Tail Ln in the adjacent neighborhood of Holly Park. The entrance at Old Monroe Rd is less than 1.25 miles West of Old Monroe's intersection with Wesley Chapel Rd./Wesley Chapel-Stouts Rd. At the intersection, there are restaurants and grocery stores on 3 of the 4 sides of the intersection. The West end continues on to Midway Dr, which goes North towards U.S. 74 (E. Independence Blvd). The East/South end of Brandon Oaks Pkwy provides access to Pony Tail Ln, which intersects with Mustang Dr, taking you to the same plaza. The exit on the East/South end of the parkway is a roundabout that includes Rogers Rd, which is an exit to Wesley Chapel Rd. Rogers Rd continues Eastbound and provides a route to Charlotte-Monroe Executive Airport (On Airport Rd).

Geography of Union County, North Carolina
Neighborhoods in North Carolina

Location & Nearby Activities 
Brandon Oaks is a convenient neighborhood that has entry/exit points in multiple places, as well as connections to other neighborhoods like Holly Park.

Nearby, there are plenty of restaurants, shops, and activities such as:

 Jersey Mike's Subs
 Harris Teeter
 Starbucks (#1)
 Great Clips
 First China Chinese Restaurant
 Tickle My Ribs BBQ
 Palm Beach Tan
 Wells Fargo
 Express Oil & Tire Change
 Peach Cobbler Factory
 Domino's Pizza
 Pizza Hut
 MOD Pizza
 Bojangles
 Dunkin
 Goodyear Auto Service
 McDonald's
 Infinity Dental Arts
 Starbucks
 Roar Taekwondo
 Sun Valley Café
 The Trail House
 Little Voices Pediatric Therapy
 Keller Williams Realty
 F45 Training Indian Trail
 Superfood Café
 Cinnaholic
 Kaizoku Japanese Cuisine
 Viva Chicken
 Charanda Authentic Mexican Eatery
 Hickory Tavern
 Sileo's New York Deli
 LibertyX Bitcoin ATM
 Sun Valley 14 Cinema
 Moe's Southwest Grill
 SweetFrog Frozen Yogurt
 Taco Bell
 Family Urgent Care
 All Kids Pediatric Dentistry
 Valvoline Instant Oil Change
 Wendy's
 CVS Pharmacy
 Johnny Tomatoe's Pizza
 Fix-a-Phone Plus
 1942 Mexican Bar & Grill
 Sun Valley High School
 Sun Valley Middle School
 Sun Valley Primary School
 Sun Valley Elementary School
 State Employees Credit Union
 The Goddard School of Indian Trail
 Be's Bubble Tea
 East Coast Wings + Grill
 Western Union
 Publix Supermarket
 Jet's Pizza
 Hanfield Village Dental Care
 Culver's

 Slim Chickens